EP Phone Home is Ben Kweller's first mass-produced CD in his solo career. This EP features bedroom recordings and Sha Sha demos.

Track listing
All tracks by Ben Kweller, except as noted
"Launch Ramp" – 1:51
"How It Should Be (Sha Sha)" (Ben Kweller/Joe Butcher) – 1:41
"Debbie Don't Worry Doll" – 5:05
"Harriet's Got a Song" – 4:51
"Falling" – 4:01

Personnel
Ben Kweller - engineer, vocals, guitar, piano
John Kent - drums
Josh Lattanzi - bass guitar
Jane Scarpantoni - string arrangements
Stephen Harris - engineer 
Stephen R. Herek - producer 
Jack Pierson - photography 
Liz Smith - photography 
Bryce Goggin - engineer

Ben Kweller albums
2001 debut EPs